James Kilroy (1890 – 5 January 1954) was an Irish Fianna Fáil politician and farmer.

In his earlier life Kilroy was a District Councillor for the Belmullet area and a member of the Belmullet Board of Guardians representing Sinn Féin. He was also Captain of the Ballyglass Company of the Irish Volunteers and later Adjutant of the 7th Battalion Belmullet and was captured after the burning of the Ballyglass Coast Guard Station in August 1920. He was interned in Galway, and in Portland and Dartmoor until January 1922. He took the Anti-Treaty side in the subsequent Irish Civil War and was a member of the 5th Brigade of the 4th Western Division comprising Erris and Achill and North West Mayo. He was captured near Westport in November 1922 while serving with a Flying Column there and was interred in Harepark camp until 1924.

After his release, he was an active member in Belmullet in the formation of the Fianna Fáil and was elected to Mayo County Council for Belmullet electoral area in 1927. He was elected to Dáil Éireann as a Teachta Dála (TD) for the Mayo North constituency at the 1943 general election, and was re-elected at the 1944 and 1948 general elections. He lost his Dáil seat at the 1951 general election but at the subsequent 1951 Seanad Éireann election, he was elected by the Agricultural Panel.

References

1890 births
1954 deaths
Fianna Fáil TDs
Members of the 11th Dáil
Members of the 12th Dáil
Members of the 13th Dáil
Members of the 7th Seanad
Politicians from County Mayo
Irish farmers
Fianna Fáil senators